Turcato is an Italian surname. Notable people with the surname include:

Carlo Turcato (1921–2017), Italian fencer
Dino Turcato (born 1946), Italian weightlifter
Giulio Turcato (1912–1995), Italian artist

Italian-language surnames